Valentin Ivanov (Bulgarian: Валентин Иванов; born 1 April 2000) is a Bulgarian footballer who plays as a defender for Chernomorets Burgas.

Career
On 20 May 2018, he made his professional debut in Beroe's 1–0 loss at CSKA Sofia, replacing Borislav Tsonev in the 85th minute. On 29 May 2019, Ivanov signed his first professional contract with the club.

Career statistics

Club

References

External links
 

2000 births
Living people
Bulgarian footballers
Association football defenders
First Professional Football League (Bulgaria) players
PFC Beroe Stara Zagora players
FC Minyor Radnevo players
PFC Litex Lovech players
People from Kazanlak